Shea Farm Halfway House is a state prison for women in New Hampshire, United States.

Located in Concord, New Hampshire, Shea Farm is a minimum security facility which opened in 1973. It is a transitional facility used to house adult prisoners preparing for release. It can accommodate up to 40 inmates, who are usually 6 months from parole eligibility.

External links
New Hampshire Community Corrections

Prisons in New Hampshire
Women's prisons in the United States
Buildings and structures in Concord, New Hampshire
1973 establishments in New Hampshire
Women in New Hampshire